Abdollah Bazar (also Romanized as ‘Abdollāh Bāzār) is a village in Negur Rural District, Dashtiari District, Chabahar County, Sistan and Baluchestan Province, Iran. At the 2006 census, its population was 172, in 35 families.

References 

Populated places in Chabahar County